Oka Radha Iddaru Krishnula Pelli is a 2003 Telugu-language comedy film directed by G. Nageswara Reddy and produced by D. V. V. Danayya and J. Bhagavan under Sri Balaji Creations. The film stars Srikanth, Prabhu Deva and Namitha  in the lead roles. The film was remade in Tamil as Enga Raasi Nalla Raasi (2009).

Cast

Srikanth as Viswam 
Prabhu Deva as Murugan
Namitha as Sashi Rekha 
Tanikella Bharani
Chandra Mohan
Chalapathi Rao
Sunil as  Bala Raju
Brahmanandam
M. S. Narayana
Jaya Prakash Reddy
L. B. Sriram
Kovai Sarala
Delhi Rajeswari
Melkote

Music
The music was composed by Chakri.

References

External links
 

2003 films
2000s Telugu-language films
Telugu films remade in other languages
Films directed by G. Nageswara Reddy